Guaraci or Quaraci may refer to

Guaraci, god of the Guaraní mythology
Guaraci, São Paulo, Brazilian municipality in the state of São Paulo
Guaraci, Paraná, Brazilian municipality in the state of Paraná
Guaraci Francisco de Oliveira Filho (born 1992), Brazilian footballer